Paul David Abbott (born September 15, 1967) is an American former professional baseball pitcher. He was a part of the 2001 Seattle Mariners team who tied the Major League Baseball (MLB) record for the most wins in a season, with Abbott compiling a 17–4 win–loss record. He has one of the highest lifetime winning percentages as a Mariner (.679). Since 2010, he has worked as a minor league pitching coach for the Boston Red Sox organization.

A native of Van Nuys, California, Abbott attended Sunny Hills High School, Fullerton, California, and played professional baseball for 21 consecutive years (1985–2005), including service in minor league and independent league baseball. He threw and batted right-handed.

Professional career

Minnesota Twins
With Elizabethton, Abbott went 1–5 with a 6.94 ERA in 10 games, all starts.

His next season, Abbott was promoted to the Class-A Kenosha Twins of the Midwest League. In , Abbott went 6–10 with a 4.50 ERA in 25 games, 15 starts.

In , Abbot continued to play in Class-A, this time with the Visalia Oaks of the California League. He went 11–9 with  a 4.18 ERA in 28 games, all starts. Abbott also pitched 171 innings pitched, the most in his Minor league career.

In  Abbott was promoted to the Double-A Orlando Twins of the Southern League. He went 9–3 with a 4.37 ERA in 17 games, all starts.

Abbott began the  season with the Triple-A Portland Beavers of the Pacific Coast League. He went 5–14 with a 4.56 ERA in 23 games, all starts. He was called up to the Minnesota Twins on August 21, . He went 0–5 with 25 strikeouts and a 5.97 ERA in seven games, all starts.

Golden Baseball League
In , Abbott played for the Independent San Diego Surf Dawgs and Fullerton Flyers in the Golden Baseball League.

Coaching career
Abbott has worked for the Red Sox in their farm system since 2010. On December 22, 2010, he was named pitching coach of the Lowell Spinners, Short-Season Class A affiliate of the Boston Red Sox, for the 2011 season. He had been an assistant baseball coach at Fullerton Junior College and pitching coach for the independent Orange County Flyers of the Golden Baseball League. He has a son named Trent Abbott who attended Troy High School and played baseball for Fullerton College  and he was drafted by Oakland Athletics in the 36th round of the 2007 MLB draft. 
Abbot has also coached East Fullerton Little League teams for his younger son. In January 2018, Abbott joined the Double-A Portland Sea Dogs as their pitching coach. In January 2020, he was named pitching coach of the Triple-A Pawtucket Red Sox.

References

External links

Paul Abbott at Pura Pelota (Venezuelan Professional Baseball League)

1967 births
Arizona League Mariners players
Canton-Akron Indians players
Charlotte Knights players
Cleveland Indians players
Elizabethton Twins players
Fullerton Flyers players
Iowa Cubs players
Kansas City Royals players
Kenosha Twins players
Las Vegas Stars (baseball) players
Living people
Major League Baseball pitchers
Minnesota Twins players
Minor league baseball managers
Omaha Royals players
Orlando Twins players
Petroleros de Cabimas players
Philadelphia Phillies players
Portland Beavers players
San Bernardino Stampede players
San Diego Surf Dawgs players
Scranton/Wilkes-Barre Red Barons players
Seattle Mariners players
Baseball players from Los Angeles
Tacoma Rainiers players
Tampa Bay Devil Rays players
Tigres de Aragua players
American expatriate baseball players in Venezuela
Tucson Sidewinders players
Visalia Oaks players
Minor league baseball coaches
Baseball coaches from California